Russia participated in the Eurovision Song Contest 2014 in Copenhagen, Denmark. The Russian entry was selected internally by the Russian broadcaster Russia-1 (RTR). The Tolmachevy Sisters, winners of the Junior Eurovision Song Contest 2006, represented Russia with the song "Shine", which qualified from the first semi-final and placed 7th in the final, scoring 89 points.

Before Eurovision

Internal selection 
On 1 September 2013, RTR announced that a national final, titled Kto?, would take place on 31 December 2013 to select the Russian entry for the Eurovision Song Contest 2014. RTR opened a submission period for interested artists and composers to submit their entries and a jury panel was to evaluate the received submissions and select 25 entries for the competition, however RTR announced in December 2013 that the national final would be postponed until March 2014 and the submission deadline would be extended until 28 February 2014. Plans for the national final were later abandoned by the broadcaster due to the poor quality of submitted songs.

On 15 March 2014, RTR announced that they had internally selected the Tolmachevy Sisters to represent Russia in Copenhagen. The Tolmachevy Sisters' selection as the Russian representative was decided upon by a jury panel. Tolmachevy Sisters previously won the Junior Eurovision Song Contest in 2006. The Russian song, "Shine", was presented to the public on 19 March 2014. "Shine" was composed by Philipp Kirkorov and Dimitris Kontopoulos, with lyrics by John Ballard, Ralph Charlie and Gerard James Borg; Kontopoulos, Ballard and Charlie had previously co-written the 2013 Azerbaijani entry "Hold Me.

Competing entries

At Eurovision 

During the semi-final allocation draw on 20 January 2014 at the Copenhagen City Hall, Russia was drawn to compete in the first half of the first semi-final on 6 May 2014. In the first semi-final, the producers of the show decided that Russia would perform 7th, following Albania and preceding Azerbaijan. Russia qualified from the first semi-final and competed in the final on 10 May 2014. During the winner's press conference for the first semi-final qualifiers, Russia was allocated to compete in the second half of the final. In the final, the producers of the show decided that Russia would perform 15th, following France and preceding Italy. Russia placed 7th in the final, scoring 89 points.

At the contest, the Tolmachevy Sisters were joined on stage by four backing vocalists: Anna Nilsson, Jenny Tärneberg, Anna Strandberg and Rui Andrade. The Russian performance featured the Tolmachevy Sisters performing with long translucent sticks and interacting with a platform that moved like a balance and eventually opened into a white sun-like canvas.

Following the revelation of Russia's qualification into the final during the broadcast of the first semi-final, the announcement was met by an audible booing from the venue audience . The negative reaction was believed to be a response to Russia's involvement in the crisis in Ukraine and its stance on LGBT rights.

In Russia, both the semi-finals and the final were broadcast on Russia-1 with commentary by Olga Shelest and Dmitriy Guberniev. The Russian spokesperson revealing the result of the Russian vote in the final was 2000 Russian contest entrant and Eurovision Song Contest 2009 final co-presenter Alsou.

Voting

Points awarded to Russia

Points awarded by Russia

Detailed voting results
The following five members comprised the Russian jury:
  (jury chairperson)conductor
 radio DJ, television host
 Leonid RudenkoDJ, musician, label producer
 musician, singer, poet, composer
 Yulia Nachalovasinger

References

2014
Countries in the Eurovision Song Contest 2014
Eurovision